Amin Osman, also known as Amin Osman Pasha, (28 November 1898–5 January 1946) was an Egyptian judge and politician who served as finance minister in the period 1943–1944. He was assassinated by Hussein Tawfik, who was connected with the Egyptian army officers, on 5 January 1946.

Early life and education

Amin Osman was born in the Muharram Bey neighborhood of Alexandria on 28 November 1898. His father was a secretary general in the municipality of Alexandria.

Educated at Victoria College and then at Brasenose College, Oxford, Amin Osman was a judge by profession. He continued his studies in law in Paris.

Career
Following his graduation Osman joined the ministry of finance in Cairo. He was a member of the Egyptian delegation led by the Prime Minister Mustafa El Nahas which signed the Anglo-Egyptian Treaty in August 1936. Osman adopted a pro-British political stance and was part of a group created by the British diplomats to control the Egyptian politics. He was the primary liaison between the Prime Ministers Mustafa El Nahas and then Mohammed Mahmoud Pasha and the British Embassy in Cairo. However, next Prime Minister Ali Maher Pasha fired Osman soon after he took over the office in August 1939. Osman was serving as the undersecretary of finance before his dismissal.

Osman's next post was the director of the National Bank of Egypt. Following the Waft Party's formation of the government he was named as the head of the audit department of the finance ministry in February 1942. In a cabinet reshuffle dated 2 June 1943 he was appointed minister of finance to the cabinet led by Mustafa El Nahas and replaced Kamel Sidki in the post. It was the fifth cabined headed by Mustafa El Nahas. Osman served in the post until October 1944 when the cabinet was dissolved. Although Osman served in the Wafd cabinet, he was not a member of the party.

Personal life and assassination
Osman married a British woman, Katie. They had a daughter. 

He was assassinated in front of the Old Victorian Club on Sharia Adly in Cairo on the evening of 5 January 1946. He died shortly after the attack. The assassination was planned by the Egyptian army officers, including Anwar Sadat who would be the president of the country, and their target was also Prime Minister Mustafa El Nahas. When the assassins led by Hussein Tawfiq did not manage to kill Mustafa El Nahas on 26 December 1945, they targeted and murdered Amin Osman. A funeral ceremony for Amin Osman was held on 6 January in Cairo, and he was buried in the tomb of Imam Al Shafi'i there. 

Tawfik was arrested soon and based on his confession Anwar Sadat, Mohammed Ibrahim Kamel, and others were also arrested and jailed. Of them Sadat was released from the prison in 1948.

Awards
Osman was the recipient of the Order of the British Empire which was awarded as a result of his contributions in the sign of the Anglo-Egyptian Treaty in 1936.

References

External links

1946 murders in Egypt
20th-century Egyptian judges
1898 births
1946 deaths
Alumni of Brasenose College, Oxford
Assassinated Egyptian politicians
Deaths by firearm in Egypt
Finance Ministers of Egypt
Independent politicians in Egypt
Members of the Order of the British Empire
People murdered in Egypt
Politicians from Alexandria
Victoria College, Alexandria alumni